Strug is a river of Poland, a tributary of the Wisłok near Rzeszów.

Rivers of Poland
Rivers of Podkarpackie Voivodeship